Coleophora saponariella is a moth of the family Coleophoridae. It is found from Sweden to Portugal and Italy and from France to Poland and Romania.

Larvae can be found from September to May.

References

saponariella
Moths of Europe
Moths described in 1848